The Moorook railway line was a  railway line on the South Australian Railways network. It ran from a junction with the Barmera line at Wanbi north to Yinkanie near Moorook opening on 7 September 1925. It was proposed to later extend the line to Moorook and Kingston On Murray if demand arose, but road transport improved so the railway was never extended, and the line was closed on 1 May 1971.

Route
The route of the line was designed to cover the gap between the Waikerie and Loxton lines at the lowest cost.
The names of the new stations were Gluyas, Caliph, Bayah, Tuscan, Koowa, Wunkar, Myrla, Wappalka and Yinkanie.

References

External links

Closed railway lines in South Australia
Railway lines opened in 1925
Railway lines closed in 1971